Aqeel Anjum (born 7 March 1987) is a Pakistani cricketer. He played in 64 first-class, 36 List A, and 32 Twenty20 matches between 2005 and 2014.

References

External links
 

1987 births
Living people
Pakistani cricketers
Hyderabad (Pakistan) cricketers
National Bank of Pakistan cricketers
Sindh cricketers